Chania International Airport "Daskalogiannis"  is an international airport located near Souda Bay on the Akrotiri peninsula of the Greek island of Crete, serving the city of Chania,  away. It is a gateway to western Crete for an increasing number of tourists. The airport is named after Daskalogiannis, a Cretan rebel against Ottoman rule in the 18th century and is a joint civil–military airport. It is the sixth busiest airport in Greece.

History
The focus on civil aviation for the west of Crete has not always been on the current location. It was the airport of Maleme that served civil flights up to 1959, and dating back to the end of Second World War.

Maleme (Military) Airport was constructed by the British Military, shortly before the Second World War. When the war was over, the facility was used as the main public airport of Chania. 

In 1959, this activity was transferred to the military airport of Souda. 1967 saw the construction of the first passenger terminal and parking space for two aircraft. In 1974, the airport also began to serve international flights. Because of insufficient capacity, there was the need for a new terminal building. It has a design capacity of 1.35 million passengers per year.
In 2000, it was officially named Ioannis Daskalogiannis.

The airport is also intensively used as a military airfield by the Hellenic Air Force.

In December 2015 the privatisation of Chania International Airport and 13 other regional airports of Greece was finalised with the signing of the agreement between the Fraport AG/Copelouzos Group joint venture and the state privatisation fund. "We signed the deal today," the head of Greece's privatisation agency HRADF, Stergios Pitsiorlas, told Reuters. According to the agreement, the joint venture will operate the 14 airports (including Chania International Airport) for 40 years as of 11 April 2017.

In June 2018 Fraport Greece completed the new aircraft layouts, which are now using push back to double the parking space. The passenger safety area has been expanded, the number of hand baggage scanners from 5 to 8, the duty-free store space trebled from 400 sq.m. to 1,200 sq. meters, the VIP space moved to increase the number of boarding gates from 14 to 16 and the dividing walls in the departure halls were removed in order to create a space of 3,000 sq. meters. A new sewage pumping station was built and the network (about 3.5 km) was connected to the municipal network, electromechanical installations (new MCCs, wiring, lighting, electrical panels, etc.) were optimized, the apron lighting was upgraded, the WCs were renovated to increase the number of toilets in the non-Schengen area, and the escalator was moved to use the available space better.

On June 10, 2018, Air Force One carrying U.S. President Donald Trump stopped for refueling in Chania during Trump's flight from the G7 meeting in Quebec to the meeting in Singapore with the leader of North Korea Kim Jong-un.

Fraport Greece's investment plan

On 22 March 2017, Fraport Greece presented its master plan for the 14 Greek regional airports, including Chania International Airport.

Immediate actions that will be implemented at the airports as soon as Fraport Greece takes over operations, before the summer of 2019:

 General clean-up
 Improving lighting, marking of airside areas
 Upgrading sanitary facilities
 Enhancing services and offering a new free Internet connection (WiFi)
 Implementing works to improve fire safety in all the areas of the airports
 Rearranging the terminal's internal utilization
 Rearranging the departure gate lounge
 Expanding the security control area
 HBS (Hold Baggage Screening Systems) inline screening
 Expanding the waste water treatment plant or connection to municipal service
 Reorganizing the apron area
 Refurbishing the airside pavement
 25 percent increase in the number of departure gates (from 8 to 10)
 Doubling the number of security-check lanes (from 4 to 8)

Airlines and destinations
The following airlines operate regular scheduled and charter flights at Chania  Airport:

Traffic figures

The data are from Hellenic Civil Aviation Authority (CAA) until 2016, and from 2017 and later from the official website of the airport.

Traffic statistics by country (2022)

Transportation to and from the airport
The airport can be easily reached by car, bus or taxi via the main road network. The city of Chania is about 22 minutes' drive away. in 2022 the bus fare is €3.20 and the supposed flat-rate taxi fare is €23.

See also
List of airports in Crete
List of the busiest airports in Greece
Transport in Greece

References

External links

http://www.ypa.gr/en/our-airports/kratikos-aerolimenas-xaniwn-i-daskalogiannhs-kaxnd/ 
HCAA website
Greek-Airports website
Greek Airport Guide 
Hellenic Civil Aviation Authority

Airports in Greece
Buildings and structures in Chania (regional unit)
Tourism in Crete
Souda Bay
Hellenic Air Force bases
Airports in Crete
Space Shuttle Emergency Landing Sites